The ovate sole (Solea ovata) is a species of flatfish in the true sole family, Soleidae native to the Indo-Pacific.  Solea ovata has eyes on the right side with small scales on the sides of its body (ovata). The total length of its mitogenome is 16,782 bp with 13 protein-coding genes, 22 tRNA genes, and 2 rRNA genes. The organism, Solea Ovata was found in Guangdong province, China. Solea Ovata are usually found in shallow sand and mud at the  bottom of water throughout the coast of Indo-Pacific ocean.

References

ovate sole
Commercial fish
Fish of the Indian Ocean
Fish of the Pacific Ocean
ovate sole